The Vermilac River is an  river in Baraga County on the Upper Peninsula of Michigan in the United States. The river flows from Little King Lake through King Lake and then into Worm Lake. The Vermilac River is a tributary of Worm Lake, the outlet of which is the Rock River, which flows to the Sturgeon River and eventually to Lake Superior.

See also
List of rivers of Michigan

References

Rivers of Michigan
Rivers of Baraga County, Michigan
Tributaries of Lake Superior